The Xinjiang Uyghur Autonomous Region Museum, or Xinjiang Museum, is located in Urumqi, Xinjiang, China. Its address is 581 Xibei Road, Urumqi.

The museum holds over 40,000 items of various cultural relics and specimens, including 381 national first-grade cultural relics (国家一级文物). In May 2008, the Xinjiang Museum was included in the first batch of the National first-grade museums of China.

General
The Xinjiang Museum was established in August 1959. The current museum building was built and opened for public on September 20, 2005.

Exhibits
The museum has been set up to show the four major exhibits: "Recover the Western Region's Glory of Yesterday - the exhibit of the historical cultural relics in Xinjiang", "the exhibit of Xinjiang's ethnic customs", "The Mummies of the Immortal World - the exhibit of the ancient mummies of Xinjiang,", “The Historical Monuments – the exhibit of Xinjiang's revolutionary history”.

Gallery

See also
 List of museums in China
 Turpan Museum
 Hotan Cultural Museum

References

External links

Buildings and structures in Ürümqi
Museums in Xinjiang
National first-grade museums of China